Rosa diamante (Diamond Rose) is a Spanish-language telenovela produced by United States-based television network Telemundo Studios, Miami and Mexican Argos Comunicación. It is a remake of Argentinian telenovela Perla Negra, written by Enrique Torres. Carla Hernández, Mauricio Ochmann, and Lupita Ferrer are starring in this telenovela.

History 
From July 10 to July 23, 2012, Telemundo aired half-hour episodes of Rosa Diamante weeknights at 8:30pm/7:30c, along with Una Maid en Manhattan. Starting July 24, 2012, Telemundo aired Rosa Diamante weeknights at 8pm/7c, replacing Una Maid en Manhattan. The last episode was broadcast on January 21, 2013, with Pasión Prohibida replacing it the following day. As with most of its other telenovelas, the network broadcast English subtitles as closed captions on CC3.

Plot 
A wealthy sophisticated woman (Rosaura) abandons a newborn baby girl in a boarding school, and leaves nineteen diamonds with her. 18 of the diamonds are meant to pay for each year of her school expenses, until the baby reaches eighteen years old, and the last diamond is pink colored, and is supposed to be given to the baby girl when she grows up and is ready to leave the school. Years pass, Rosa turns into a beautiful young lady. Her biggest treasures are her boundless imagination and her friendship with Eva, who is another girl at the boarding school.

One fine day, Eva meets a boy named José Ignacio, a wealthy young man who makes fun of her and pretends his name is Adam, just to lure her in. The young Eva falls in love and ends up pregnant but Jose Ignacio leaves her. After giving birth, a terrible car accident abruptly ends Eva's life. Rosa, who was also in the accident, is mistakenly identified as Eva in the aftermath, and Rosa lets everyone believe she really is Eva so that little Eduardito will not end up in an orphanage. Rosa sets on a plan of revenge on Jose Ignacio, who just happens to be Eva's cousin, Barbara's fiancé. She also strives to give Eduardito proper love.

Cast

Main cast 
Mauricio Ochmann as José Ignacio Altamirano
Lupita Ferrer as Rosaura Sotomayor
Carla Hernández as Eva Sotomayor / Rosa Andrade

Also as main cast 
Claudia Ramírez as Raquel Altamirano
Begoña Narváez as Bárbara Montenegro
Sofía Lama as Andrea Fernández
Luis Xavier as Gerardo Altamirano
Manuel Balbi as Gabriel Robles
Luciana Silveyra as Margaret Bridges / Margarita Puentes
Néstor Rodulfo as Ramón Gómez
Marco de Paula as Gerardo Altamirano Jr
Patricia Conde as Leticia Sotomayor
Ignacio Riva Palacio as Martín Montenegro
Heriberto Méndez as Sergio Escobar
Tsuria Díaz as Valeria Sotelo
Mariana Villalvazo Martín as Lucía Altamirano
Ofelia Guiza as Soledad "Chole"

Supporting cast 
Marco Treviño as Antonio Andrade
Julieta Grajales as Maria Corina Villalta
Arnoldo Picazzo as Vladimir Bonilla
Roberto Uscanga as Jairo Roncancio

Special participation 
Patricio Castillo as Eduardo Sotomayor
Thali García as Eva Sotomayor
Constantino Costas as Rodolfo Montenegro
Tamara Mazarrasa as Graciela

Awards and nominations

References

External links 
Rosa Diamante Official Web Site

2012 American television series debuts
2013 American television series endings
American television series based on telenovelas
Spanish-language American telenovelas
Telemundo telenovelas
2012 telenovelas
Argos Comunicación telenovelas
American television series based on Argentine television series